For the American entertainment lawyer, see Irwin Russell.

Irwin Russell (June 3, 1853 - December 23, 1879) was an American poet. His poems were published in Scribner's Magazine and The Times-Democrat. His bust was installed in the Mississippi State Capitol in 1907.

He wrote "humorous, sympathetic pictures of the quaintly sage and irresponsibly happy old-time plantation negro."

References

1853 births
1879 deaths
People from Port Gibson, Mississippi
Poets from Mississippi